is a district located in Chiba Prefecture, Japan.

As of 2011, the district has an estimated population of 43,480 and a density of 845 persons per km2. The total area is 51.48 km2.

There are two towns within the district.
Sakae
Shisui

District timeline
January 1, 1957 - Parts of Yotsukaidō merged into the city of Sakura.
September 1, 1964 - The village of Shiroi gained town status.
April 1, 1981 - The town of Yotsukaidō gained city status.
April 1, 1985 - The village of Tomisato gained town status.
April 1, 1992 - The town of Yachimata gained city status.
April 1, 1996 - The town of Inzai gained city status.
April 1, 2001 - The town of Shiroi gained city status.
April 1, 2002 - The town of Tomisato gained city status.
March 23, 2010 - The villages of Inba and Motono merged into the city of Inzai.

Districts in Chiba Prefecture